St. Mary's Hospital was a psychiatric hospital in Castlebar, County Mayo, Ireland.

History
The hospital, which was designed by George Wilkinson opened as the Castlebar Asylum in 1866. It was extended in the late 1890s. It became the Castlebar Mental Hospital in the 1920s and it went on to become St. Mary's Hospital in the 1950s. 

Pádraig Flynn, Minister of State at the Department of Transport, officially opened a new Industrial Therapy Unit in May 1981. After the introduction of deinstitutionalisation in the late 1980s the hospital went into a period of decline and closed in 2006. The building was converted for use as the Mayo Campus of the Galway-Mayo Institute of Technology in 1994.

References

Hospitals in County Mayo
Marys
Hospital buildings completed in 1866
1866 establishments in Ireland
Hospitals established in 1866
Defunct hospitals in the Republic of Ireland
2006 disestablishments in Ireland
Hospitals disestablished in 2006